Elizabeth Eyre is a pseudonym used by the authors Jill Staynes (1927–2013) and Margaret Storey (born c. 1927) for their Sigismondo series of novels.

Biography
From the dust jacket of Bravo for the Bride (1994):

Writing style
The Eyre novels are marked by colourful characters and an atmospheric treatment of its Italian Renaissance setting. While some characters are clearly intended as comic relief, the humour is dry and unobtrusive. The stories themselves are carefully plotted and well thought out.

The work should not be confused with that of Margaret Storey -  the author of books for children and young adults who wrote the magic realism series of "Tim and Melinda" books.

Critical response
The Sigismondo series received a positive response from many reviewers when it was released, with good reviews appearing in the Sunday Express (London) and the Weekend Telegraph (London), some of which were reprinted on the dust jackets of the later volumes in the series.

Influence on popular culture
The books contributed to the historical mystery subgenre that arose in the 1990s with the success of Ellis Peters and the Cadfael series and Lindsey Davis and the Marcus Didius Falco series.

Although well received at the time of their release, the books now appear to be out of print, though many are still available through libraries and second-hand book traders.

Bibliography
Death of the Duchess 1991
Curtains for the Cardinal 1992
Poison for the Prince 1993
Bravo for the Bride 1994
Axe for an Abbot 1995
Dirge for a Doge 1996

References

External links
Elizabeth Eyre Bio on ItalianMysteries.com

British mystery writers
Writers of historical mysteries
Women mystery writers
Women historical novelists
Collective pseudonyms
Pseudonymous women writers
20th-century British women writers
20th-century British novelists
British historical fiction writers
British women novelists
Writers of historical fiction set in the early modern period
20th-century pseudonymous writers